Angolan Communist Party (in Portuguese: Partido Comunista Angolano) was an underground political party in Portuguese Angola (during the Estado Novo regime), founded in October 1955, under influence from the Portuguese Communist Party. PCA was led by the brothers Mário Pinto de Andrade and Joaquim Pinto de Andrade (a Catholic priest). PCA set up clandestine schools and libraries in Luanda, and established branches in Catete and Malanje.

In December 1956 it merged into the People's Movement for the Liberation of Angola (MPLA).

References

National liberation movements in Africa
Rebel groups in Angola
Political parties established in 1955
Political parties disestablished in 1956
Defunct political parties in Angola
Communist parties in Angola
MPLA
1955 establishments in Angola